Flock Rock: Best of the Flock is a compilation album by The Flock. It includes songs from their first and second albums, as well as other previously unreleased songs.

Track listing

"Introduction" - 4:53
"Clown" - 7:44
"I Am the Tall Tree" - 5:30
"Tired of Waiting for You" - 4:38
"What Would You Do If the Sun Died?" - 2:48
"Lollipops and Rainbows" -  4:05
"Green Slice" -   2:04
"Big Bird" -   5:50
"Hornschmeyer's Island" -   7:25
"Crabfoot" -   8:16
"Mermaid" -   4:53
"Chanja" -   2:38
"Atlantians Truckin Home" -   4:50
"Afrika" -   4:34
"Just Do It" -  6:35

Personnel 
 Jerry Goodman - Violin, Guitars, Vocals
 Fred Glickstein - Guitars, Lead vocals, keyboards
 Jerry Smith - Bass guitar, Vocals
 Ron Karpman - Drums, Vocals
 Tom Webb - Vocals, sax, flute
 Rick Canoff - Sax, Vocals
 Jon Gerber - Sax, flute, keyboards, Vocals
 Rick Mann - Guitar, Vocals
 Frank Posa - Trumpet, Posaphone

References

The Flock (band) albums
2008 compilation albums